Dropsy is a condition in fish caused by the buildup of fluid inside the body cavity or tissues. As a symptom rather than a disease in its own right, it can indicate a number of underlying diseases, including bacterial infections, parasitic infections, or liver dysfunction.

Causes

The symptoms collectively known as “dropsy” may be caused by a multitude of reasons. Poor water quality, viral infections, sudden changes in water conditions and a prolonged period of stress that may compromise the fish’s immune system may all trigger said symptoms.

Symptoms
The following symptoms may be observed:
Swelling of the abdomen
Eyes that are beginning to swell and bulge
Scales that starting to point outward instead of lying flush with their body giving a "pinecone" appearance
A loss of color in their gills
Clamping of the fins
A curve developing in their spine
Pale feces
Swelling near their anus
A loss of appetite
A lack of energy and movement

Treatment
Because dropsy is a symptom of an illness, its cause may or may not be contagious. However, it is standard practice to quarantine sick fish to prevent spreading the underlying cause to the other fish in the tank community in case the disease causing dropsy is contagious. However, this quarantine is only effective when the disease is caught early.

Traditionally, when fish would exhibit dropsy, it was advised to “destroy” it. However recently, it is recommended to “bathe” the fish in water that has aquarium or epsom salts dissolved in it, as the process of osmosis may help relieve pressure on the fish. Antibiotics may destroy or weaken the pathogen if it is bacterial so that the immune system of the fish is capable of overcoming the underlying disease.

Prognosis
By the time a disorder reaches the point of causing dropsy, it can often be fatal and at the very least the fish is very ill and requires immediate quarantine and treatment.

References

Fish diseases
Fishkeeping